The Law Rides is a 1936 American Western film directed by Robert N. Bradbury.

Cast 
Bob Steele as Bruce Conway
Harley Wood as Arline Lewis
Buck Connors as Whitey
Charles King as Hank Davis
Margaret Mann as Mrs. Lewis
Jack Rockwell as Sheriff Anderson
Norman Neilsen as Jack Lewis (prospector)
Barney Furey as Henchman Pete

See also
Bob Steele filmography

External links 

1936 films
1930s English-language films
American black-and-white films
1936 Western (genre) films
American Western (genre) films
Films directed by Robert N. Bradbury
1930s American films